Falmenta was a comune (municipality) in the Province of Verbano-Cusio-Ossola in the Italian region Piedmont, located about  northeast of Turin and about  north of Verbania.

On 1 January 2019 the municipalities of Cursolo-Orasso, Cavaglio-Spoccia and Falmenta merged into the municipality of Valle Cannobina.

Falmenta bordered the following municipalities: Aurano, Cannobio, Cavaglio-Spoccia, Gurro, Miazzina, Trarego Viggiona.

Demographic evolution

References

Frazioni of Valle Cannobina
Former municipalities of the Province of Verbano-Cusio-Ossola
Cities and towns in Piedmont